Karin Tracey van Wirdum (born 9 April 1971) is a former freestyle swimmer from Australia, who competed in three consecutive Summer Olympics for her native country, starting in 1988. She won the gold medal in the 100-meter freestyle at the 1990 Commonwealth Games and in the 50-metre freestyle at the 1994 Commonwealth Games.

See also
 List of World Aquatics Championships medalists in swimming (women)
 List of Commonwealth Games medallists in swimming (women)

References

1971 births
Living people
Sportswomen from Queensland
Olympic swimmers of Australia
Swimmers at the 1988 Summer Olympics
Swimmers at the 1992 Summer Olympics
Swimmers at the 1996 Summer Olympics
Swimmers at the 1990 Commonwealth Games
Swimmers at the 1994 Commonwealth Games
World Aquatics Championships medalists in swimming
Commonwealth Games gold medallists for Australia
Commonwealth Games silver medallists for Australia
Swimmers from Brisbane
Commonwealth Games medallists in swimming
Australian female freestyle swimmers
Medallists at the 1990 Commonwealth Games
Medallists at the 1994 Commonwealth Games